Tracy Darin Rogers (born August 13, 1967) is a former professional American football linebacker who played seven seasons in the National Football League (NFL) for the Kansas City Chiefs.

1967 births
Living people
People from Taft, California
Players of American football from California
American football linebackers
Fresno State Bulldogs football players
Kansas City Chiefs players
Taft Cougars football players